Julian Jenkins (born October 25, 1983) is a former gridiron football defensive end. He attended Woodward Academy in College Park, Georgia, where he was a three-sport athlete in football, basketball and track and field.  Jenkins played both defensive end and defensive tackle in college at Stanford University. His father, Eddie Jenkins, was a former professional football player  for the 1972 Miami Dolphins. Julian Jenkins helped the Calgary Stampeders win the 2008 Grey Cup.

References

External links
Calgary Stampeders bio
Stanford Cardinal bio

1983 births
Living people
American football defensive ends
Stanford Cardinal football players
Tampa Bay Buccaneers players
Denver Broncos players
Calgary Stampeders players
Players of American football from Boston
Players of American football from Georgia (U.S. state)
Woodward Academy alumni